Cristy Spencer is a beauty pageant title holder from Cape Verde. She holds the title Miss Cape Verde 2013 and will compete at Miss World 2015 pageant to be held in China.

Earlier Life
Cristy Spencer is studying Marketing and Publicity.

Pageants
Miss Cape Verde 2015

Cristy was crowned Miss World Cape Verde 2015 at the conclusion of the Miss Cabo Verde 2015 pageant.  The pageant was held on August 27, 2015, at the National Auditorium.

Miss World 2015

Cristy will represent Cape Verde at Miss World 2015 on Sanya, China on December 19, 2015, however, it withdrew because of lack of fund

Miss ECOWAS 2013

Cristy Spencer was elected Miss ECOWAS (Economic Community of West African States) on the weekend of December 14 & 15, 2013. She was crowned by her predecessor, Guinea's Mariama Diallo and received a $6,000 US dollars in prize money.

References

Living people
Cape Verdean beauty pageant winners
Year of birth missing (living people)